Sweden has participated in all World Championships in Athletics since the beginning in 1983. Sweden's second largest city, Gothenburg, hosted the event in 1995.

Medalists

Medal tables

By championships

By event

By gender

References

Nations at the World Athletics Championships
Athletics in Sweden